East Jersey Old Town Village (also spelled East Jersey Olde Towne Village) is an open-air museum located in Johnson Park in Piscataway, New Jersey. The Village is a collection of Raritan Valley area historic buildings and includes original, reconstructed, and replicated 18th and 19th century vernacular architecture typical of farm and merchant communities of Central Jersey. It is home to a permanent exhibition about Raritan Landing, an 18th-century inland port once located just downstream on the river. Since 1989, the Middlesex County Office of Arts and History has had responsibility for the village.

Buildings and original location

See also
List of the oldest buildings in New Jersey
Cornelius Low House 
Metlar-Bodine House
Ephraim Fitz-Randolph House
Road Up Raritan Historic District
Monmouth County Historical Association
Meadows Foundation (New Jersey)
New Bridge Landing
Six Mile Run
Jacobus Vanderveer House - brother of Elias Vanderveer

References

External links

 
 
 
 

Museums in Middlesex County, New Jersey
Open-air museums in New Jersey
Buildings and structures in Middlesex County, New Jersey
Piscataway, New Jersey
Pre-statehood history of New Jersey
Vernacular architecture in New Jersey
Historic American Buildings Survey in New Jersey